Grace Groner (4 April 1909 – January 19, 2010) was an American woman recognized after her death for a posthumous gift of seven million dollars to her alma mater, Lake Forest College.

Biography

Life
Groner was born in 1909 in a small Lake County, Illinois, farming community. She had a twin sister, Gladys, who died in April, 2007. Upon their being orphaned at age 12, both sisters were taken in by George Anderson, one of the prominent members of the community. He paid for both of them to attend nearby Lake Forest College, from which they graduated in 1931. Grace Groner never married.

For many years Groner lived with Ann Findlay, an elderly relative of George Anderson, in a small apartment in the building that housed the Lake Forest movie theater, which was owned by the Anderson family. She was always considered "family" by the Anderson family.

In 1935, Groner purchased three sixty dollar shares in Abbott Laboratories, where she also worked for 43 years. Over the years, her shares split many times, and she reinvested the dividends each time. She had few needs, lived in a small cottage willed to her, bought clothes at rummage sales, but travelled extensively. She also gave money to the needy, but kept her name anonymous .

Over the years, Groner remained close to Lake Forest; she donated $180,000 to help start a scholarship fund and attended college football games. In 2008, she set up a foundation that would receive her estate upon her death. It was estimated that the foundation would earn $300,000 a year on interest from her estate.

Death and will
On January 19, 2010, Groner died. After her death it was revealed that her estate totaled in excess of seven million dollars and was left to a foundation she had established prior to her death.  She expressed her desire that the income should be used to benefit students of Lake Forest College by funding independent study, internships, international study and service projects, as well as a possible grant to a student attending pharmacy school.  Upon being told of this, college president Stephen D. Schutt is said to have exclaimed, "Oh, my God."

Her home has been updated by her foundation and is currently occupied by two senior Lake Forest College women during their senior year who have made significant contributions to the college community and who have received a foundation grant. The women live in the home as Grace's guests.  It is estimated that some 1,300 students will benefit from her will. The home will be known as "Grace's Cottage."

References

Philanthropists from Illinois
Lake Forest College alumni
People from Lake Forest, Illinois
1909 births
2010 deaths
20th-century American philanthropists